The akekee (Loxops caeruleirostris) is a bird species in the family Fringillidae, where it is placed in the Hawaiian honeycreeper genus Loxops. It is endemic to the island of Kauai where it is found in small numbers in higher elevations. Because of their similar size, shape, and unusual bill, the akekee and the akepa (Loxops coccineus) were for some time classified as a single species. This was eventually changed, because of differences in their color, nesting behavior, and calls.

Description and behavior
The akekee is a greenish-yellow bird with a black mask around the eye (especially prominent in the male) and a bluish bill, unlike the akepa, which is usually red, canary-yellow or orange, without black, and has a horn-colored bill. The bill-tips are crossed over, though not bent as in the distantly-related crossbills (Loxia). The akekee uses its bill like scissors to cut open buds in search of insects to eat. It also feeds on the nectar of some trees. This bird builds nests primarily of twigs high up in trees, while the akepa uses tree cavities as nest sites.

Habitat
The akekee is currently found only in the Waimea Canyon State Park, Alakai Wilderness Preserve and Kōkee State Park. It has been heading toward extinction because of its lack of tolerance to alteration of its habitat, which is based on mesic and wet forests, especially ōhia lehua (Metrosideros polymorpha) trees.

Threats

The akekee is threatened by the introduction of plants like the banana pōka (Passiflora tarminiana), a passionflower vine, that displace the native plants. Feral pigs and feral goats also destroy native growth. The lack of native host plants leads to the decline of the insects on which the akekee feeds. Avian malaria (Plasmodium relictum) and fowlpox transmitted by accidentally introduced mosquitoes continues to affect the akekee, limiting its populations to habitat above 1,100 meters ASL, where mosquitoes do not occur. Forest clearing in different parts of the island of Kauai has caused the loss of habitat for this and many other bird species.

The conservation status for this species was updated to critically endangered in 2008 due to a rapid decrease in population over the preceding decade. The 2012 population was estimated under 5,000 individuals, in 2016 fewer than 1,000, and in 2021 fewer than 638. Of all the highly threatened Hawaiian birds, the akekee has the largest rate of decline, with the population size declining by 21% every year. It is predicted at the current rate, the species will go extinct by 2028. Only 7 captive individuals are known, although due to its complex social interactions, the species does not take well to captivity. The most effective conservation strategy would be landscape-scale control of mosquitoes using Wolbachia.

References

Loxops
Hawaiian honeycreepers
Endemic birds of Hawaii
Critically endangered fauna of Hawaii
Birds described in 1890
Taxa named by Scott Barchard Wilson
Taxonomy articles created by Polbot
ESA endangered species
Critically endangered fauna of the United States